The 34th Guam Legislature was the last meeting of the Guam Legislature. It convened in Hagatna, Guam on January 2, 2017 and ended on January 7, 2019, during the third and fourth years of Eddie Calvo's 2nd Gubernatorial Term.

In the 2016 Guamanian legislative election, the Democratic Party of Guam won a majority of seats in the Guam Legislature.

Party Summary

Leadership

Legislative
 Speaker: Benjamin J.F. Cruz
 Vice Speaker: Therese M. Terlaje
 Legislative Secretary: Regine Biscoe Lee

Majority (Democratic)
 Majority Leader: Thomas C. Ada
 Assistant Majority Leader: Joe S. San Agustin
 Majority Whip: Telena Cruz Nelson

Minority (Republican)
 Minority Leader: James V. Espaldon
 Assistant Minority Leader: Thomas A. Morrison
 Minority Whip: Mary Camacho Torres
 Assistant Minority Whip: Louise Borja Muna

Membership

Committees

References 

Legislature of Guam
Politics of Guam
Political organizations based in Guam